Burress is an unincorporated community in Fillmore County, Nebraska, United States.

History
Burress was founded in 1887 when the railroad was extended to that point. It was named for J. Q. Burress, the original owner of the town site. A post office was established at Burress in 1887, and remained in operation until it was discontinued in 1942.

References

Unincorporated communities in Fillmore County, Nebraska
Unincorporated communities in Nebraska